Atla  or ATLA may refer to:

Organizations
 Acquisition, Technology & Logistics Agency, a Japanese Ministry of Defense agency for the Japan Self-Defense Forces
 American Association for Justice (previously the Association of Trial Lawyers of America), a nonprofit advocacy and lobbying organization for plaintiff's lawyers
 American Theological Library Association, a nonprofit, 501(c)(3), professional association, headquartered in Chicago, Illinois

Places
 Atla River, a river in Rapla County, Estonia
 Atla, Birbhum, a village in Rampurhat I CD Block in Rampurhat subdivision of Birbhum district, West Bengal, India
 Atla, Rapla County, a village in Juuru Parish, Rapla County, Estonia
 Atla, Saare County, a village in Saaremaa Parish, Saare County in western Estonia

Other
 ATLA – A Story of the Lost Island, a fantasy novel by Ann Eliza Smith
 Atla (automobile), a French automobile that was manufactured from 1957 to 1959
 Atla (lichen), a genus of crustose lichens in the family Verrucariaceae
 ATLA: All This Life Allows, Vol. 1, the second studio album by American rapper Stat Quo
 Atla, one of the Nine Mothers of Heimdallr who gave birth to the god Heimdallr
 Avatar: The Last Airbender, an American animated television series

See also
 Atala (disambiguation)
 Atlas (disambiguation)
 Attla (disambiguation)